The septal nasal cartilage (cartilage of the septum or quadrangular cartilage) is composed of hyaline cartilage. It is somewhat quadrilateral in form, thicker at its margins than at its center, and completes the separation between the nasal cavities in front.

Its anterior margin, thickest above, is connected with the nasal bones, and is continuous with the anterior margins of the lateral cartilages; below, it is connected to the medial crura of the major alar cartilages by fibrous tissue.

Its posterior margin is connected with the perpendicular plate of the ethmoid; its inferior margin with the vomer and the palatine processes of the maxillae.

References

External links
  - "Diagram of the skeleton of medial (septal) nasal wall."
  - "Nasal septum, lateral view"
 

Nose